Hsiao-Wen Chen is a Taiwanese-American astronomer who uses absorption spectroscopy to study baryonic "normal matter" in the intergalactic medium and galactic halos, and the connections between this matter and the matter in star-forming regions of galaxies. She is a professor of astronomy and astrophysics at the University of Chicago.

Education and career
Chen studied physics at National Taiwan University, earning a bachelor's degree in 1992 and a master's in 1994. She completed a Ph.D. in astronomy at Stony Brook University in 1999.

After postdoctoral research at the Carnegie Observatories from 1999 to 2002, and as a Hubble Fellow at the Massachusetts Institute of Technology from 2002 to 2005, Chen became an assistant professor of astronomy at the University of Chicago in 2005. She was promoted to associate professor in 2012 and full professor in 2017. She has also been affiliated with the university's Kavli Institute for Cosmological Physics since 2007.

She was her university's representative to the Association of Universities for Research in Astronomy from 2006 to 2017, vice-president of the intergalactic medium commission of the International Astronomical Union from 2015 to 2021, and chair of the Hubble Space Telescope Users Committee for 2016–2017.

Recognition
The American Astronomical Society named Chen to their 2022 class of AAS Fellows, "for fundamental work using quasar absorption-line observations to study the halo gas content of galaxies".

References

External links
Home page

Year of birth missing (living people)
Living people
American astronomers
American women astronomers
Taiwanese astronomers
Taiwanese women scientists
National Taiwan University alumni
Stony Brook University alumni
University of Chicago faculty
Fellows of the American Astronomical Society